Penrod and Sam is a 1931 American pre-Code comedy film directed by William Beaudine and starring Leon Janney and Frank Coghlan Jr. It is an adaptation of the novel Penrod and Sam by Booth Tarkington. Beaudine had previously directed a 1923 silent version, and was invited to remake his earlier success.

Plot
Penrod Schofield and Sam Williams are good friends and founding members of the In-Or-In boy's club. Penrod is perpetually in trouble at school and in the neighborhood because of the pranks he plays. Georgie Bassett and Rodney Bitts, two other boys at school, are always complaining to adults about Penrod and Sam, so the boys will not allow them into their club. When Georgie's father, Mr. Bassett, tells this to Penrod's father, Henry Schofield, Mr. Schofield insists that the boys invite Georgie to join their club. Having been forced into accepting Georgie, they decide to make his initiation especially unpleasant. Rodney, who also dislikes the boys, then pretends that Penrod and Sam harmed him, and the two boys are unfairly punished. Meanwhile, Penrod and Sam argue over a girl, Marjorie Jones, whom they both like, and Penrod's dog, Duke, is run over by a car. Penrod hits his lowest period when Penrod's father sells the empty lot where the clubhouse is located to Mr. Bitts, who throws the boys off the land. Out of revenge, Rodney even refuses to allow Penrod to visit Duke's grave next to the clubhouse. When he realizes how much the lot means to Penrod, Mr. Schofield buys the land back from Mr. Bitts, and having learned his lesson, Penrod makes up with Sam and invites Rodney to join the club.</ref>

Cast
 Leon Janney as Penrod  
 Frank Coghlan Jr. as Sam
 Margaret Marquis as Marjorie Jones  
 Billy Lord as Georgie Bassett 
 Michael Stuart as Rodney Bitts  
 Jimmy Robinson as Herman Washington 
 Robert Dandridge as Verman Washington
 Matt Moore as Henry Schofield  
 Dorothy Peterson as Mrs. Schofield  
 Helen Beaudine as Margaret Schofield  
 Johnny Arthur as Mr. Bassett  
 ZaSu Pitts as Mrs. Bassett 
 Charles Sellon as Mr. Bitts

Preservation status
This film as well as a 1923 silent and the 1936 update are all preserved in the Library of Congress collection.

References

Bibliography
 Marshall, Wendy L. William Beaudine: From Silents to Television. Scarecrow Press, 2005.

External links

1931 films
American comedy films
American black-and-white films
1931 comedy films
1930s English-language films
Films directed by William Beaudine
Warner Bros. films
Films based on American novels
Films based on works by Booth Tarkington
Remakes of American films
Sound film remakes of silent films
1930s American films